The Valley of Ten Thousand Smokes is a valley within Katmai National Park and Preserve in Alaska which is filled with ash flow from the eruption of Novarupta on June 6–8, 1912. Following the eruption, thousands of fumaroles vented steam from the ash. Robert F. Griggs, who explored the volcano's aftermath for the National Geographic Society in 1916, gave the valley its name, saying that "the whole valley as far as the eye could reach was full of hundreds, no thousands—literally, tens of thousands—of smokes curling up from its fissured floor."

Prior to the eruption, the area now called the Valley of Ten Thousand Smokes was an unremarkable and unnamed portion of the Ukak River valley. Although never permanently inhabited by humans, it served as a pass for the Alutiiq people, as well as animals such as grizzly bears.

As many as 14 major earthquakes between  6 to 7, and over 100 earthquakes greater than  5, resulted from the collapse of the caldera at Mount Katmai and movement within the magmatic plumbing system.

The ash-filled valley covers a  area. In places deep canyons have been cut by the River Lethe, allowing observers to see the ash flow strata. Since the ash has cooled, most of the fumaroles are now extinct and despite its name the valley is no longer filled with 'smoke' (i.e. steam). Vegetation still does not grow in the valley. The signs of volcanic activity are still visible on nearby hills.

Katmai's most recent eruption was in 1927, but there have been non-eruptive events as recently as 2003.  The Alaska Volcano Observatory still monitors Katmai's activity as part of the Katmai Cluster, where there are five active stratovolcanos within  of Katmai.

Visitors to the valley most commonly arrive via bus along the  road from Brooks Camp, which is the only road in Katmai Park. The valley is a source of creative exploration by photographers and naturalists.

Geology
Basement rocks in the area consist of the Late Jurassic Naknek Formation, which is composed of siltstones, and arkosic sandstones 1.7–2 km thick deposited in a marine shelf and submarine fan delta environment during the Oxfordian-Tithonian. Some 20 dioritic and granodioritic Tertiary plutons pierce the formation.  Most prevalent though are the Quaternary stratovolcanoes along the Aleutian Arc associated with the Aleutian subduction zone.

The 1912 Novarupta eruption was characterized by three main episodes spanning 60 hours.  Episode I included both a rhyolitic ignimbrite and a simultaneous Plinian dispersal of rhyolitic tephra fallout.  The ignimbrite consisted of 9 separate packages of pumiceous pyroclastic flow deposits, radiating outward 9 km, and which filled 11 km3 of the valley to a depth of 100–200 m in the upper portion and 35 m in the lower over the span of 16 hours.  It is indurated in the upper valley while nonwelded in the lower.  The ignimbrite is noted for its fumaroles, phreatic craters, welded tuff, and flattened fiamme.  At the same time, a Plinian dispersal of 8.8 km3 of rhyolitic tephra occurred depositing layers A and B.  Episode II consisted of a second Plinian dispersal, but one consisting of dacite tephra, depositing 4.8 km3 of layers C and D.  Episode III was also a Plinian dispersal of dacite tephra depositing 3.4 km3 of layers F and G.

The explosion from the eruption was heard as far away as Fairbanks and Juneau, while earthquakes continued until mid-Aug. Ball lightning near the ground was noted in addition to regular thunder and lightning, rare in South Alaska, while severe static disrupted wireless transmissions.  Volcanic dust reached Wisconsin on June 8, Algeria on June 19 and California on June 21.  Fields of pumice were seen floating in Katmai Bay, 241 km to the southwest, in 1913.  Griggs noted 1000 fumarolic plumes over 500 feet high in 1916.  In 1917, diffuse steam emanations were still evident and temperatures were 97 °C just 1 m below the surface.  In 1918, Jasper Sayre and Paul Hagelbarger noted 86 vents with temperatures greater than 190 °C, the hottest being 432 °C.  The steam was measured to be 99.5% water vapor with some acidic gases of HCl, CO2, H2S and HF.  Only a few hundred emanations were seen by 1929, and just 10 were left by 1940.

Astronaut training
The Katmai Peninsula in general, and the valley in particular, were used by NASA and the USGS to geologically train the Apollo astronauts in recognizing volcanic features, landforms and materials, especially fumaroles and vents.  Two separate groups of astronauts trained here, the first in June–July 1965 and a second group in August 1966.  Their field exercises included simulating a lunar mission.  "Playing the Moon game", involved pairing up astronauts and placing them in a location with very little prior information.  They then planned traverses and collected representative samples.  They communicated with their geologist instructors via radio.  Astronauts who would use this training on the Moon included Apollo 11's Buzz Aldrin, Apollo 12's Alan Bean, Apollo 14's Edgar Mitchell, Apollo 15's James Irwin, Apollo 16's Charlie Duke, and Apollo 17's Gene Cernan and Jack Schmitt.  Notable geologist instructors included Garniss Curtis and Gene Shoemaker.

References

External links

Alaska Volcano Observatory page on Katmai
Maps of region

Volcanoes of Lake and Peninsula Borough, Alaska
Volcanoes of Alaska
Ten Thousand Smokes
Katmai National Park and Preserve